"I'm Livin' in Shame" is a 1969 song released for Diana Ross & the Supremes on the Motown label. The sequel to the Supremes' number-one hit, "Love Child," the song peaked in the top ten on the US Billboard Hot 100 pop chart at #10 and the top 20 in the UK at #14 in April and May 1969.

Background and release
Inspired by the plot of Douglas Sirk's 1959 film  Imitation of Life, The Clan composed "I'm Livin' in Shame" as a sequel to the Supremes' number-one hit single, "Love Child." The song explores the quest of the 'love child' to shun both her impoverished childhood and her mother, and pass herself off to her friends and new husband as the daughter of a rich family. The woman's mother ends up dying without ever seeing her daughter as an adult, or ever meeting her two-year-old grandson, to the child's regret and chagrin.

The girl group debuted the single live on the Sunday, January 5, 1969 episode of the popular CBS variety program, The Ed Sullivan Show, peaking at number 10 on the American pop chart and at 14 on the UK singles chart in late winter and early spring of 1969. The recorded release is without the backing vocals of Mary Wilson or Cindy Birdsong (as with many singles released under this group's billing, session singers The Andantes appear on the record).

Cash Box described it as a "spectacular performance and another standout song" that continues the story of the Supreme's earlier single "Love Child."

Personnel
Lead vocals by Diana Ross
Background vocals by the Andantes: Jackie Hicks, Marlene Barrow, and Louvain Demps
Instrumentation by the Funk Brothers

Track listing
7" single (6 January 1969) (North America/United Kingdom/Netherlands)
"I'm Livin' in Shame" – 2:58
"I'm So Glad I Got Somebody (Like You Around)" – 2:58

Charts

References

1969 singles
The Supremes songs
Songs written by R. Dean Taylor
Motown singles
Songs written by Berry Gordy
Songs written by Frank Wilson (musician)
Songs written by Henry Cosby
Songs written by Pam Sawyer
Psychedelic soul songs
Song recordings produced by Frank Wilson (musician)
1969 songs